"The Debate" is the seventh episode of the seventh season of American serial political drama The West Wing. The episode aired on November 6, 2005 on NBC. The episode was a live stage performance, recorded twice for the Eastern and Western Coasts of the United States. During the episode, Jimmy Smits and Alan Alda spar as Matt Santos and Arnold Vinick, respectively, in their roles as candidates for president of the United States.

Synopsis 
The episode begins by focusing on both presidential candidates in the final minutes before the debate. Both candidates express their fear, with Vinick telling his advisor that "terrified doesn't even begin to cover it". Vinick expresses his frustration for the rules, too, admitting that it limits his ability to express his ideas. Both candidates walk on stage, and the moderator explains the rules; two minutes for an answer to a question, followed by a one minute rebuttal, followed by thirty seconds for a counterpoint. Vinick, given the time for the first opening statement, chooses to go off-script and propose that the rules of the debate be scrapped, choosing instead to have both candidates partake in a one-to-one conversation with each other, which Santos agrees to. The two spar on a number of issues, including health care, public education, immigration, energy, and ideology. During the health care portion of the debate, both Santos and Vinick leave their podium while attempting to make bold statements, causing an offscreen technician to have to give both handheld microphones. While discussing energy, Vinick proposed nuclear power as a way to reduce reliance on oil from outside sources. Santos objected to nuclear power, arguing that it is dangerous, to which Vinick replied that "nuclear power is completely safe". In a later episode, concerning a potential meltdown of a nuclear reactor in Vinick's home state of California, Vinick's statement was clipped and re-aired repeatedly.

Cast 

 Jimmy Smits as Matt Santos, the Democratic nominee for president of the United States
 Alan Alda as Arnold Vinick, the Republican nominee for president of the United States
 Forrest Sawyer as himself, the debate moderator

Production 
The episode was shot live twice and formatted as if it were a real presidential debate, with Forrest Sawyer, a real-life American journalist and broadcaster, acting as himself to moderate the debate. Lawrence O'Donnell, an executive producer of the show, commented that the episode was "my wish-fulfillment debate". The episode was partially scripted and partially improvised, with two performances for the West and East Coasts of the United States. Jimmy Smits told Empire that the episode was shot as if it were a play, with both Smits and Alda being given a "crash course" in debating that allowed them to improvise.

Alan Alda commented that his connection to the character allowed him to improvise, and said that he really "wanted to defeat Jimmy—I mean Jimmy as the character". When told of Alda's comment, Jimmy Smits replied "No, he wants to win".

Despite the risky nature of a live performance, O'Donnell commented that he was not worried, telling the Associated Press that it would be just as fun to watch if things went wrong, akin to a "train wreck".

Reaction and impact 
Around 9.6 million viewers saw the episode, a significant uptick from the average of 8.2 million for the seventh season that far. The Associated Press referred to the episode as both "startlingly realistic" and "straight out of fantasyland", wondering why real-life politicians would not emulate the open-debate format. The Plain Dealer thought that the episode was the "best fictional debate of our time" in a list of eight fictional film and television debates.

In a post-debate poll conducted by MSNBC and Zogby International of 1,208 viewers, respondents thought that Santos won the debate, by 54 to 38 percent. However, in a pre-debate poll, 59 percent of viewers favored Santos, as opposed to 29 percent who thought Vinick was the better candidate. Santos beat Vinick by only three points on the question of who was more presidential, 42 to 39. Of respondents, 78 percent thought the debate moderator, Forrest Sawyer, did an "excellent" or "good" job. While respondents felt that the debate was unrealistic, they also preferred it to a real-life debate.

In 2021, the New Jersey Globe announced that two candidates for the New Jersey Senate in the 16th legislative district, Republican Michael Pappas and Democrat Andrew Zwicker, would participate in an open debate inspired by "The Debate". The debate was set up to downsize the role of the moderator significantly, where they would only ask the first question and let both candidates continue the conversation for the remaining hour.

References

External links
 

2005 American television episodes
The West Wing (season 7) episodes